Louis Carré (17 December 1897 – 11 September 1977) was a French art dealer. He is well known for having commissioned the building of the Maison Louis Carré by Alvar Aalto, which is the only remaining building by Aalto in France.

References

External links
 Website of his Art Gallery
 Maison Louis Carré website

1897 births
1977 deaths
French art dealers